Albert Gallatin High School is a public high school, serving 1,052 students (2018–2019) in the eight south-western municipalities of Fayette County, Pennsylvania. The present-day AGHS is located in Georges Township five miles south of Uniontown proper.

History
Albert Gallatin High School was originally created in 1961, consolidating the Masontown and Point Marion high schools at the present-day AG Middle School South campus, near Point Marion. It was not until 1986 that the present building (the former Fairchance-Georges High School) was used as the sole High School for the district, combining all three (at that time) district's High Schools and creating two Middle Schools. The name was briefly changed to  Tri-Valley High School, representing the changes. Finally, in 1993, the school board renamed the school to its present name, to reflect the founding father of the area, Albert Gallatin. Within 1993 and now, the school had a complete renovation and addition process, as well as technology improvements, and a new Athletic Complex, including a new fieldhouse.

Extracurriculars and athletics
A plethora of athletic sports programs and extracurricular activities are available at AG.

Athletics
Albert Gallatin High School is a member of the Pennsylvania Interscholastic Athletic Association (PIAA) and the Western Pennsylvania Interscholastic Athletic League (WPIAL).  Albert Gallatin is in PIAA District 7. In 2019, the football program chose to become independent of the WPIAL.

Boys
Baseball - AAAA
Basketball - AAAA 06-07 WPIAL runner-up
Cross Country - AAA
Football - AAA
Golf - AAAA
Soccer - AAA
Track and Field - AAA
Wrestling - AAA

Girls
Basketball - AAAA
Cross Country - AAA
Soccer - AAA
Softball - AAAA
Track and Field - AAA
Volleyball - AAA

Clubs
 AGTV
 AGSN
 Art Club
 Bleacher Creatures
 Book Club
 Drama
 Interact Club
 AGHS NAACP Chapter
 Ski Club
 Yearbook

Extracurricular Activities 

 AGHS band
 Freshman Class
 Sophomore Class
 Junior Class
 Senior Class
 Future Business Leaders of America (FBLA)
 Future Educators of America
 JROTC
 The Gallatin Gazette
 SADD
 Student Council
 Senior Class Trip

References

Public high schools in Pennsylvania
Schools in Fayette County, Pennsylvania
1951 establishments in Pennsylvania
Educational institutions established in 1951